The Wonju Won clan is a Korean clan. Their Bon-gwan is in Wonju, Gangwon Province (historical). The clan was a prominent yangban family during Korea's Joseon dynasty.

According to the research held in 2015, the number of the Wonju Won clan was 126677. Their founder was  who was dispatched by Emperor Taizong of Tang in Tang dynasty as one of the Hanlin Academy.

See also 
 Korean clan names of foreign origin

References

External links 
 

 
Korean clan names of Chinese origin
Won clans